In organization development, the initial phase within the Cognitive work analysis (CWA) framework is Work Domain Analysis. It provides a description of the constraints that govern the purpose and the function of the systems under analysis.

Abstraction hierarchy 
The Abstraction Hierarchy (Rasmussen, 1985; Vicente, 1999) is used to provide a context-independent description of the domain. The analyses, and resultant diagrams, are not specific to any particular technology; rather they represent the entire domain.

 The top-three levels of the diagrams consider the overall objectives of the domain, and what it can achieve.
 The bottom-two levels concentrate on the physical components and their affordances.

Through a series of ‘means-ends’ links, it is possible to model how individual components can affect the overall domain purpose. The abstraction hierarchy is constructed by considering the work system’s objectives (top-down) and the work system’s capabilities (bottom-up). The diagram is constructed based upon a range of data collection opportunities. The exact data collection procedure is dependent on the domain in question and the availability of data. In most cases, the procedure commences with some form of document analysis. Document analysis allows the analyst to gain a basic domain understanding, forming the basis for semi-structured interviews with domain experts. Wherever possible, observation of the work in context is highly recommended.
 
The abstraction hierarchy consists of five levels of abstraction, ranging from the most abstract level of purposes to the most concrete level of form (Vicente, 1999). The levels are normally called 

 Functional Purpose (FP),
 Abstract Function (AF),
 Generalized Function (GF),
 Physical Function (PFn) and
 Physical Form (PFo).

The labels used for each of the levels of the hierarchy tend to differ, dependent on the aims of the analysis. Below, the labels used by Xiao et al are shown.

Domain levels 

 The domain purpose, displayed at the very top of the diagram, represents the reason why the work system exists. This purpose is independent of any specific situation, it is also independent of time – the system purpose exists as long as the system does.
 The domain values level of the hierarchy is used to capture the key values that can be used to assess how well the work system is performing its domain purpose(s). These values are likely to be conflicting.
 The middle layer of hierarchy lists the functions that can be performed by the combined work system. These functions are expressed in terms of the domain in question.
 The physical functions are listed which the objects can perform. These are listed generically and are independent of the domain purpose.
 The key physical objects within the work system are listed at the base of the hierarchy. These objects represent the sum of the relevant objects from all of the component technologies. This level of the diagram is independent of purpose; however, analyst judgement is required to limit the object list to a manageable size.

Summary 
The structure of the abstraction hierarchy framework acts as a guide to acquiring the knowledge necessary to understand the domain. The framework helps to direct the search for deep knowledge, providing structure to the document analysis process, particularly for the domain novice. While the output may initially appear overbearing, its value to the analysis cannot be overstated. The abstraction hierarchy defines the systemic constraints at the highest level.

One of the advantages of the abstraction hierarchy model is that it can be used to explore the effect of new technology on the system values and purposes. Additional technologies can be modelled at the base of the model and their effect assessed through the mean-ends links to the top of the diagram.

References

Systems thinking